Gilly Lane (born August 26, 1985 in Philadelphia) is a professional squash player who represents the United States. He reached a career-high world ranking of World No. 48 in May, 2010.

References

External links 
 
 

American male squash players
Living people
1985 births
Sportspeople from Philadelphia
Penn Quakers men's squash coaches
Penn Quakers men's squash players